The 2015 World RX of Sweden was the sixth round of the second season of the FIA World Rallycross Championship. The event was held at the Höljesbanan in Höljes, Värmland.

Heats

Semi-finals

Semi-final 1

Semi-final 2

Final

† Timmy Hansen was given a 2-second penalty for exceeding track limits

Championship standings after the event

References

External links

|- style="text-align:center"
|width="35%"|Previous race:2015 World RX of Germany
|width="30%"|FIA World Rallycross Championship2015 season
|width="35%"|Next race:2015 World RX of Canada
|- style="text-align:center"
|width="35%"|Previous race:2014 World RX of Sweden
|width="30%"|World RX of Sweden
|width="35%"|Next race:2016 World RX of Sweden
|- style="text-align:center"

Sweden
World RX